Imbophorus is a genus of moths in the family Pterophoridae.

Species

Imbophorus aptalis (Walker, 1864)
Imbophorus leucophasmus (Turner, 1911)
Imbophorus pallidus Arenberger, 1991

Pterophorini
Moth genera